Luis González Palma (1957) is a Guatemalan photographer. Much of his work "has revolved around the strange hybrids of race and culture that add up to Latin America."

Life and work
Luis González Palma, was born in Guatemala City, Guatemala in 1957. After training to be an architect at Universidad de San Carlos de Guatemala, he began a career in photography and video.

His first individual exhibition, Autoconfesion, was in 1989 at the Museum of Contemporary Hispanic Art, New York, and had a breakthrough at the Houston FotoFest in 1992. He was awarded the Gran Premio PHotoEspaña award in 1999, exhibited his work in the 49th and 51st Venice Biennale, and contributed to the production of The Death and the Maiden in the Malmö Opera, 2008.

Publications 
Luis González Palma. Fabrica.
Il Silencio Dei Maya. Verona: Peliti, 1998.
Luis González Palma: Poems of Sorrow. Santa Fe: Arena, 1999. With text by John Wood.

References

General references
Becerril, Roxana (23 October 2019 ) "Latin American artist creates stories with photos and string." The Daily Aztec. Retrieved 2020-06-30.
Giraldo, Sol Astrid (n.date) "Luis González Palma : The Body's Resistance." Panorama of the Americas. Retrieved 2020-06-30.

McCabe, Jennifer (24 June 2015) "Hidden Histories in Latin American Art at the Phoenix Art Museum." Daily Serving, An International Publication for Contemporary Art.  Retrieved 2020-06-30

Luis Gonzalez Palma Permanent Collection North Dakota Museum of Art

External links 

Guatemalan photographers
Latin American artists of indigenous descent
Mestizo photographers
1957 births
Living people
People from Guatemala City
20th-century Guatemalan people
21st-century Guatemalan people
Universidad de San Carlos de Guatemala alumni